The 1922 St. Xavier Musketeers football team was an American football team that represented St. Xavier College (later renamed Xavier University) as in the Ohio Athletic Conference (OAC) during the 1922 college football season. In its third season under head coach Joseph A. Meyer, the team compiled a 6–2–1 record and outscored opponents by a total of 209 to 109.

Schedule

References

St. Xavier
Xavier Musketeers football seasons
St. Xavier Saints football